Judo competitions at the 2014 Commonwealth Games in Glasgow, Scotland were held from 24 July to 26 July at the Scottish Exhibition and Conference Centre. Judo returned to the program after last being held at the 2002 Commonwealth Games.

England and home nation Scotland dominated the tournament, with six golds apiece, England leading the table on minor medals. Wales and South Africa won a single gold medal each. In all 15 nations won medals.

Medal table

Results

Men's events

Women's events

Participating nations

See also
Judo at the 2014 Summer Youth Olympics

References

External links
 Official results book – Judo
 

 
2014 Commonwealth Games events
C
2014
Judo in Scotland
Judo competitions in the United Kingdom